Andrei Aleksandrovich Perov (born 29 July 1981) is a Russian former professional footballer. He made his debut in the Russian Premier League in 2006 for FC Torpedo Moscow.

References

Russian footballers
FC Khimki players
FC Torpedo Moscow players
FC KAMAZ Naberezhnye Chelny players
1981 births
Living people
Russian Premier League players
FC Volgar Astrakhan players
Association football midfielders
FC Ural Yekaterinburg players
FC Orenburg players
FC Avangard Kursk players